Gilbert Duclos-Lassalle (born 25 August 1954) is a former French professional road racing cyclist who was a specialist at one-day classic cycling races. He raced from 1977 to 1995, one of the best French riders of a generation that included Bernard Hinault and Laurent Fignon.

Born in Lembeye, Duclos-Lassalle was a specialist of Paris–Roubaix, but it took "Duclos", as the public called him, a long time to win. After finishing second to Francesco Moser in 1980 and Hennie Kuiper in 83, he won in 1992, finishing on Roubaix Velodrome 20 seconds ahead the German Olaf Ludwig.

Duclos-Lassalle was 37 years old. But the next year he won again, beating the Italian Franco Ballerini on the line. Ballerini, who thought he won, lifted his arms in triumph after the line but had been beaten by Duclos-Lassalle in a very close finish.

Not a climber, Duclos-Lassalle was never a contender for the Tour de France but he rode well in one-week races such as Paris–Nice or the Critérium du Midi Libre.

A cobbled secteur used in Paris–Roubaix between Wallers and Hélesmes was officially named "Pont Gibus" in tribute to Duclos-Lassalle in time for the 2013 edition of the race. This is the second of the race's cobbled sections to be named after him: the secteur between Cysoing and Bourghelles is known as the "Pavé Gilbert Duclos-Lassalle".

His son Hervé Duclos-Lassalle is also a professional cyclist.

Gilbert Duclos-Lassalle has worked since retirement as a television commentator.

Major results

 Paris–Roubaix (1992, 1993)
 Paris–Nice (1980)
 Bordeaux–Paris (1983)
 GP Plouay (1981, 1987)
 Stage of the Critérium International (1982)
 GP Midi Libre (1991)
 Stage of Critérium du Dauphiné Libéré (1993)

Organized by year 

1979
 46th, Overall, Tour de France
1980
 1st, Overall Paris–Nice
 1st, Overall Étoile des Espoirs
 2nd, Paris–Roubaix
1981
 1st, GP Plouay
 28th, Overall, Tour de France
1982
 1st, Stage 1, Critérium International
 2nd, Overall Paris–Nice
 60th, Overall, Tour de France
1983
 1st, Bordeaux–Paris
 1st, Grand Prix de Fourmies
1984
  National Cycling Championship – Pursuit
 1st, Overall Étoile des Espoirs
1985
 2nd, Bordeaux–Paris
 61st, Overall, Tour de France
1987
 1st, GP Plouay
  Intermediate sprints classification, 80th, Overall, Tour de France
1988
 36th, Overall, Tour de France
1989
 1st, Overall, Route du Sud
1990
 65th, Tour de France
1991
 1st, Stage, GP Midi Libre
 60th, Tour de France
1992
 1st, Paris–Roubaix
1993
 1st, Paris–Roubaix
 1st, Stage 2, Critérium du Dauphiné Libéré
1994
 1st, Stage 3, Route du Sud
1995
 1st, Stage 2, Ronde van Nederland

References

External links 
 Complete palmarès (French)

1954 births
Living people
French male cyclists
Cycling announcers
Sportspeople from Pyrénées-Atlantiques
Cyclists from Nouvelle-Aquitaine